Sar Rag (also known as Seyyed Āḥmad Bag and Seyyed Aḩmad Beyg) is a village in Kuhdasht-e Shomali Rural District, in the Central District of Kuhdasht County, Lorestan Province, Iran. According to the 2006 census, its population was 34, in 5 families.

References 

Towns and villages in Kuhdasht County